rotein KIAA1219 is a protein that in humans is encoded by the RALGAPB gene.

References

Further reading